The Heavenly Tenants is a children's fantasy novel by William Maxwell. The Marvell family farm in Wisconsin is visited by the living signs of the zodiac; meanwhile, the constellations associated with them disappear from the sky. The story was illustrated by Ilonka Karasz and published by Harper & Brothers in 1946. It was a runner-up for the 1947 Newbery Medal.

References

External links

 Public domain online edition at the University of Pennsylvania  A Celebration of Women Writers

1946 American novels
Children's fantasy novels
American children's novels
American fantasy novels
Newbery Honor-winning works
Novels set in Wisconsin
Harper & Brothers books
1946 children's books